The  and the related  were commuter electric multiple unit (EMU) train types that were operated by the private railway operator Tokyu Corporation in the Kanto region of Japan from 1980 until 2019.

Technical specifications
The trains have stainless steel car bodies. Tokyu operated the 8090 series as five- and eight-car sets, with three and six motored cars per trainset. The 8590 series cab cars have emergency exit doors in the front to permit operation on underground lines.

History
8090 series trains were introduced on the Tokyu Toyoko Line in 1980. The 8090 and 8590 series trains were built by Tokyu Car.

Resale

Chichibu Railway

Former Tokyu 8090 series cars were transferred to Chichibu Railway, which designated them as 7500 and 7800 series.

Toyama Chihō Railway

References

Electric multiple units of Japan
8090 series
Train-related introductions in 1980

1500 V DC multiple units of Japan
Tokyu Car multiple units